{{DISPLAYTITLE:C2H6S}}
The molecular formula C2H6S (molar mass: 62.13 g/mol, exact mass: 62.0190 u) may refer to:

 Dimethyl sulfide (DMS), or methylthiomethane
 Ethanethiol, or ethyl mercaptan